Tommy Parker may refer to:

Tommy Parker (footballer) (1924–1996), English footballer
Tommy Parker (judge) (born 1963), American judge in Tennessee
Tommy Parker (rugby league), Welsh rugby league footballer of the 1920s and 1930s

See also
Thomas Parker (disambiguation)
Tom Parker (disambiguation)